is a Japanese football player. He plays for Kataller Toyama.

Career
Yohei Ono joined J2 League club Kyoto Sanga FC in 2017.

Club statistics
Updated to end of 2018 season.

References

External links
Profile at Kyoto Sanga

1994 births
Living people
Tokoha University alumni
Association football people from Tokyo
Japanese footballers
J2 League players
J3 League players
Kyoto Sanga FC players
Kataller Toyama players
Association football forwards